The Audi Tunnel is a twin-tracked railway tunnel on the Nuremberg–Ingolstadt–Munich high-speed railway just north of Ingolstadt in Bavaria, Germany. It lies just outside Ingolstadt Nord station and passes under part of the Audi car factory site (hence the name) as well as other industrial and residential areas. With a length of 1258 metres (from kilometre post 84.995 to 86.253) it is the second shortest of the new tunnels on this newly built line. The tunnel was originally planned to be 1138 metres long, but was extended north by 120 metres.

External links 

 
 ICE new Nuremberg–Ingolstadt high-speed line, Audi-Tunnel Nord (PDF, 773 kB)

Railway tunnels in Germany
Audi
Ingolstadt
Tunnels completed in 2006